

Results – Elite

Results – U23

Results – Junior

See also
UCI Mountain Bike & Trials World Championships

References

 Official results

Cross country men